Sebastian Garay (born June 1, 1983 in Mendoza, Argentina) is a singer, musician and composer of Argentine folklore. It is considered one of the outstanding personalities of the new generation of Latin American folklorists. He is currently in production of his third album, titled Animalidad.

Discography  
 Piel y barro (Skin and mud) – (2008)
 Folclor o no folclor (Folklore or folklore) – (2015)

References

External links 
 

1983 births
National University of Cuyo alumni
Argentine folk singers
Argentine people of Spanish descent
Living people
21st-century Argentine  male singers
Argentine male singer-songwriters